Andrei Pavel and Alexander Waske were the defending champions, but chose not to participate that year.

Bob Bryan and Mike Bryan won in the final 6–3, 6–2, against Mariusz Fyrstenberg and Marcin Matkowski.

Seeds
All seeds receive a bye into the second round.

Draw

Finals

Top half

Bottom half

External links
Draw

Doubles